Edge of Twilight is a multi-platform, multi-genre series of steampunk titles, all taking place in the same world, a world which is made up of two realms: day and night. The series itself will not be a particular genre, but instead focus on fleshing out a complete world as the series progresses.

Games

Main series

Edge of Twilight: Athyr Above
Edge of Twilight: Athyr Above is the first canon installment in the series. It was released on iOS on March 28, 2013, and will later be released on the Google Play Store. The game involves a large number of puzzles, and gives players the chance to switch between the protagonist, Lex's, Day and Night personas. Players can mix and match combat talents with the game's skill system, as well as including an "easy to use but hard to master" combat system. As well as puzzles, the game is primarily action-based in terms of combat with RPG elements also available.

Edge of Twilight

Edge of Twilight, which is set for release in summer 2013, will be the first console game of the series. It will focus around Lex, a half-breed who can bridge the gap between the realms of darkness and light. The forthcoming title will be an action-adventure game with heavy focus on gameplay, story, and puzzles.

Other games

Edge of Twilight: Horizon
The first officially released game of the series, Edge of Twilight: Horizon is an "endless running" iOS game, much in the vein of Temple Run. The player takes the role of the protagonist Lex, as his Night persona, as he escapes from the Foresaken, a giant beast, through the forests of Hellayem.

References

External links

Steampunk video games